The 1926 Minnesota lieutenant gubernatorial election took place on November 2, 1926. Incumbent Lieutenant Governor William I. Nolan of the Republican Party of Minnesota defeated Minnesota Farmer–Labor Party challenger Emil E. Holmes and Minnesota Democratic Party candidate Charles D. Johnson.

Results

External links
 Election Returns

Minnesota
Lieutenant Gubernatorial
1926